A time trialist is a road bicycle racer who can maintain high speeds for long periods of time, to maximize performance during individual or team time trials. The term cronoman, or chronoman, is also used to refer to a time trialist.

Details
In a traditional individual time trial, riders set off alone (not in a group or peloton) at intervals, typically anything from one to five minutes, and try to complete the course in as short a time as possible. In order to maximize the overall speed a time trialist must be able to maintain a steady effort throughout the event, of which the best measure is believed to be the rider's power at lactate threshold (LT) or aerobic threshold (AT).  The best time trialists (such as Miguel Indurain, David Millar, Ellen van Dijk, Tony Martin, Tom Dumoulin and Fabian Cancellara), are believed to have very high power output at LT/AT, which they can then maintain for the duration of the time trials.

To be a successful time trialist, a cyclist must have exceptional aerodynamic posture and be able to take in plenty of oxygen. Aerodynamic performance can also be improved by riders using 'skin suits', overshoes and streamlined helmets.

Bike technology is also important in time trials. By using aerodynamic components, a bicycle can be designed to minimize its drag coefficient, allowing a rider to drop their time by minutes during a long course.

Time trials may also form individual stages of stage races. By incorporating time trial specialists into a cycling team, the team can lower its aggregate time dramatically.

In relatively flat mass-start stages and races, time trialists often work as domestiques for their team leaders, or participate in breakaways. Some riders who are primarily time-trialists have also been able to compete in everything but the steepest climbs because of their good power-to-weight ratio. Tour de France winners Miguel Indurain, Jan Ullrich and Bradley Wiggins were primarily time-trialists but were also among the best in the mountain stages during the years in which they won the Tour de France. Likewise, Tom Dumoulin was able to win the 2017 Giro d'Italia by defending the lead he had built in the individual time trial in subsequent mountain stages.

Famous time trialists

Men

  Jacques Anquetil
  Maurice Archambaud
  Lance Armstrong
  Chris Boardman
  Victor Campenaerts
  Fabian Cancellara
  Sylvain Chavanel
  Rohan Dennis
  Alex Dowsett
  Tom Dumoulin
  Viatcheslav Ekimov
  Chris Froome
  Filippo Ganna
  Daniel Gisiger
  Bernard Hinault
  Serhiy Honchar
  Miguel Indurain
  Vasil Kiryienka
  Knut Knudsen
  Greg LeMond
  Thierry Marie
  Tony Martin
  Eddy Merckx
  David Millar
  Francesco Moser
  Abraham Olano
  Lech Piasecki
  Tadej Pogačar
  Ole Ritter
  Michael Rogers
  Primož Roglič
  Tony Rominger
  Geraint Thomas
  Didi Thurau
  Jan Ullrich
  Wout Van Aert
  Remco Evenepoel
  Herman Van Springel
  Bradley Wiggins
  David Zabriskie

Women

  Anna Kiesenhofer
  Kristin Armstrong
  Lisa Brennauer
  Beryl Burton
  Chloé Dygert
  Leontien van Moorsel
  Ellen van Dijk
  Annemiek van Vleuten
  Anna van der Breggen
  Jeannie Longo
  Hayley Simmonds

See also

 UCI Road World Championships – Men's time trial
 UCI Road World Championships – Women's time trial

References

Road bicycle racing terminology